Lucius Caesennius Antoninus (c. 95after 128) was a Roman aristocrat. He was suffect consul for the nundinium of February to March 128 with Marcus Annius Libo as his colleague.

His ancestry is uncertain. Ronald Syme stated that it was possible he was the son of Lucius Caesennius Sospes, consul in 114, but in a footnote Syme admitted Antoninus could be the grandson of his brother Lucius Junius Caesennius Paetus, consul in 79.

References

Suffect consuls of Imperial Rome
Flavian dynasty
Antoninus, Lucius
Nerva–Antonine dynasty
2nd-century Romans
90s births
2nd-century deaths
Year of birth uncertain
Year of death unknown